The 1980 NCAA Division I baseball tournament was played at the end of the 1980 NCAA Division I baseball season to determine the national champion of college baseball.  The tournament concluded with eight teams competing in the College World Series, a double-elimination tournament in its thirty fourth year.  Eight regional competitions were held to determine the participants in the final event.  Seven regions held a four team, double-elimination tournament while one region included six teams, resulting in 34 teams participating in the tournament at the conclusion of their regular season, and in some cases, after a conference tournament.  The thirty-fourth tournament's champion was Arizona, coached by Jerry Kindall.  The Most Outstanding Player was Terry Francona of the Arizona.

Regionals
Seven of the eight regionals were played as 4-team double-elimination tournaments.  One regional was played as a 6-team double-elimination tournament.  The winner of each regional moved onto the College World Series.

Northeast Regional
Games played in Orono, Maine.

West Regional
Games played in Tucson, Arizona.

South Regional
Games played in Tallahassee, Florida.

Central Regional
Games played in Austin, Texas.

Atlantic Regional
Games played in Clemson, South Carolina.

East Regional
Games played in Miami, Florida.

Mideast Regional
Games played in Ann Arbor, Michigan.

Midwest Regional
Games played in Tulsa, Oklahoma.

College World Series

Participants

Results

Bracket

Game results

All-Tournament Team
The following players were members of the All-Tournament Team.

Notable players
 Arizona: Greg Bargar, Casey Candaele, Terry Francona, Craig Lefferts, John Moses, Dwight Taylor, Ed Vosberg, Kevin Ward
 California: Chuck Cary, Rod Booker, Chuck Hensley, Bob Melvin
 Clemson: Mike Brown, Jimmy Key, Danny Sheaffer, Tim Teufel
 Florida State: Mike Fuentes, Jim Weaver
 Hawaii: Chuck Crim
 Miami (FL): Neal Heaton, Ross Jones, Mike Pagliarulo
 Michigan: Steve Ontiveros, Jim Paciorek
 St. John's: John Franco, Frank Viola

See also
 1980 NCAA Division II baseball tournament
 1980 NCAA Division III baseball tournament
 1980 NAIA World Series

References

NCAA Division I Baseball Championship
Tournament
Baseball in Austin, Texas